Adoretus bicaudatus, is a species of shining leaf chafer found in India and Sri Lanka.

Description
Average length is about 12.66 mm. Body flat elongate, and parallel sided. Dorsum brown testaceous and completely covered with decumbent white setae. These setae form patches in three longitudinal rows on elytra. Head elongate and transverse. Puncturations coriaceous, and coarse posteriorly. Clypeus short and broad. Antennae clubbed and consists with nine segments. Pronotum short and transverse. Scutellum obtusely triangular and coarsely punctured. Elytra coriaceous with raised humps. Pygidium also coriaceous whereas mesosternum is laterally rugose.

Adults have been recorded from Lagerstroemia species.

References

Rutelinae
Insects of Sri Lanka
Insects of India
Beetles described in 1917